Harrespil is the Basque name, that can be translated by "stone circle", given to small megalithic monuments which abounds on mountains of the Basque Country in particular. They are also called baratz, a Basque word meaning "garden" and traditionally applied to the prehistoric necropoles. 

Gathered in necropoles of 5 to 20 monuments, they appeared during the late Bronze Age (from approximately -1200) but remained used during the Iron Age. 

These burials are distinguished from the preceding ones by the recourse to cremation, like in the urnfield culture. 

More spectacular by its fitting than by the size of the stones, the harrespil is formed of a rectangular cist made of flat stones containing ashes of the dead, and of a stone circle. 

The circle measures about 5 to 6 m in diameter and is made of a great number of medium stones. 

The cist, of approximately a meter by 60 cm, consists of 4 side flagstones and a flagstone of cover. 

These burials coexisted with tumuli, a little earlier, also sheltering a cist for ashes, but surrounded of stones in bulk. These architectures are sometimes combined, as in Zaho II where the harrespil is buried under a mound, delimited by a second stone circle.

Ruins in Nouvelle-Aquitaine
Ruins in Spain
Stone circles in Europe

eu:Harrespil